The Great Adventures of Slick Rick is the debut studio album by hip hop recording artist Slick Rick, released on November 1, 1988.

It topped Billboards Top R&B/Hip-Hop Albums chart for five nonconsecutive weeks and peaked at number 31 on the Billboard 200.

Reception

In 1998, The Great Adventures of Slick Rick was selected as one of The Sources "100 Best Albums". The album was retrospectively awarded a perfect "five-mic" score by the magazine in 2002. In 2012, it was ranked at number 99 on Slant Magazines list of "The 100 Best Albums of the 1980s". In VH1's 2008 ranking of the "100 Greatest Hip Hop Songs", the single "Children's Story" placed at number 61.

Hip hop artist Nas cites The Great Adventures of Slick Rick as one of his favorite albums. In 2009, fellow rapper Busta Rhymes said of the album:

Track listing

Personnel
Glen E. Friedman—photography
Jason Mizell (as Jam Master Jay)—producer
Eric "Vietnam" Sadler—producer
Hank Shocklee—producer
Slick Rick—vocals
Ricky Walters—producer
Rick Rubin—executive producer

Charts

Weekly charts

Year-end charts

Certifications

See also
List of number-one R&B albums of 1989 (U.S.)

References

1988 debut albums
Slick Rick albums
Def Jam Recordings albums